Kalwar may refer to:

Kalwar (caste), a caste originating in India
Kalwar, Madhya Pradesh, a village in the Indian state of Madhya Pradesh